was a Japanese film director, best known for the cult-classic Godzilla vs. Hedorah (1971), which he directed and co-wrote. Banno was a special guest at G-Fest XII in 2005. He was an executive producer on Legendary Pictures's American Godzilla films, Godzilla (2014), Godzilla: King of the Monsters (2019), and Godzilla vs. Kong (2021). He died of subarachnoid hemorrhage in 2017. King of the Monsters was dedicated to his memory along with Haruo Nakajima's.

Filmography

Director
Birth of the Japanese Islands (1970)
Godzilla vs. Hedorah (1971)
Ninja, the Wonder Boy (1985) (TV Series)

Assistant director
Throne of Blood (1957)
The Lower Depths (1957)
The Hidden Fortress (1958)
The Bad Sleep Well (1960)
Nippon musekinin jidai (The Irresponsible Age of Japan) (1962)
Nippon musekinin yaro (The Irresponsible Guys of Japan) (1962)
Kyomo ware ozorami ari (1964)
Nippon ichi no horafuki otoko (Japan's Number One Braggart Man) (1964)
Hyappatsu hyakuchu (1965)
Taiheiyo kiseki no sakusen: Kisuka (A Miraculous Military Operation in the Pacific Ocean: Kiska) (1965)
Nikutai no gakko (School of the Flesh) (1965)
Doto ichiman kairi (The Mad Atlantic) (1966)
Kureji no musekinin Shimizu Minato (The Boss of Pickpocket Bay) (1966)
Prophecies of Nostradamus (1974)

Writer
Techno Police 21c (1982)
The Wizard of Oz (1982)
Prophecies of Nostradamus (Nosutoradamusu no daiyogen) (1974)
Godzilla vs. Hedorah (1971)

Executive producer
Godzilla (2014)
Godzilla: King of the Monsters (2019) (posthumous)
Godzilla vs. Kong (2021) (posthumous)

References

External links

Japanese film directors
People from Imabari, Ehime
Neurological disease deaths in Japan
Deaths from subarachnoid hemorrhage
1931 births
2017 deaths